Grossular is a calcium-aluminium species of the garnet group of minerals. It has the chemical formula of Ca3Al2(SiO4)3 but the calcium may, in part, be replaced by ferrous iron and the aluminium by ferric iron. The name grossular is derived from the botanical name for the gooseberry, grossularia, in reference to the green garnet of this composition that is found in Siberia. Other shades include cinnamon brown (cinnamon stone variety), red, and yellow. Grossular is a gemstone.

In geological literature, grossular has often been called grossularite. Since 1971, however, use of the term grossularite for the mineral has been discouraged by the International Mineralogical Association.

Hessonite

Hessonite or "cinnamon stone" is a common variety of grossular with the general formula: Ca3Al2Si3O12.

It has a characteristic red color, inclining to orange or yellow, much like that of zircon. It was shown many years ago, by Sir Arthur Herbert Church, that many gemstones, especially engraved gems (commonly regarded as zircon), were actually hessonite. The difference is readily detected by the specific gravity, that of hessonite being 3.64 to 3.69, while that of zircon is about 4.6. Hessonite has a similar hardness to that of quartz (being about 7 on the mohs scale), while the hardness of most garnet species is nearer 7.5.

Hessonite comes chiefly from Sri Lanka and India, where it is found generally in placer deposits, though its occurrence in its native matrix is not unknown.  It is also found in Brazil and California.

Deposits
Grossular is found in contact metamorphosed limestones with vesuvianite, diopside, wollastonite and wernerite.

A highly sought after variety of gem garnet is the fine green Grossular garnet from Kenya and Tanzania called tsavorite.  This garnet was discovered in the 1960s in the Tsavo area of Kenya, from which the gem takes its name.

Viluite is a variety name of grossular; that is not a recognized mineral species. It is usually olive green though sometimes brownish or reddish, brought about by impurities in the crystal. Viluite is found associated with and is similar in appearance to vesuvianite, and there is confusion in terminology as viluite has long been used as a synonym for wiluite, a sorosilicate of the vesuvianite group. This confusion in nomenclature dates back to James Dwight Dana.  It comes from the Vilyuy river area in Siberia.

Grossular is known by many other names, and also some misnomers; colophonite – coarse granules of garnet, ernite, gooseberry-garnet – light green colored and translucent, olyntholite/olytholite, romanzovite, and tellemarkite. Misnomers include South African jade, garnet jade, Transvaal jade, and African jade.

Cultural significance
Vermont has grossular garnet as its state gemstone.

See also
 Hydrogrossular

References

External links 
Webmineral data
Mineral Data Publishing

Calcium minerals
Aluminium minerals
Garnet group
Garnet gemstones